Family law system in the UK may refer to:
English family law
Scots family law